Heliconia collinsiana (platanillo) of family Heliconiaceae is an erect herb typically growing  tall, native to Guatemala, Honduras, El Salvador, Nicaragua and southern Mexico (Chiapas, Oaxaca, Guerrero, Tabasco, Nayarit, Jalisco, Veracruz, Michoacán).

Uses
Heliconia collinsiana is a popular ornamental plant in hot regions with a humid climate. The fruits are showy, first yellow and then ripening to a bright purple-blue. It can be cultivated outdoors in frost-free areas of Southern California. It is usually grown in full sun to light shade (50% sun) and in rich, well-drained soils.

References

External links
 Heliconia collinsiana observations on iNaturalist

collinsiana
Flora of Belize
Flora of El Salvador
Flora of Guatemala
Flora of Honduras
Flora of Mexico
Flora of Nicaragua
Flora of Chiapas
Flora of Oaxaca
Flora of Guerrero
Flora of Tabasco
Flora of Nayarit
Flora of Jalisco
Flora of Michoacán
Flora of Veracruz